The Nashville Film Festival (NashFilm), held annually in Nashville, Tennessee, is the oldest running film festival in the South and one of the oldest in the United States. In 2016, Nashville Film Festival received more than 6,700 submissions from 125 countries and programmed 271 films. Attendance has grown to nearly 43,000. The festival also offers a screenplay competition with features, teleplays and shorts categories and a web series competition. In addition to tendays of film screenings, the festival provides industry panels, music showcases, parties and receptions. The Nashville Film Festival is also an Academy Award qualifying festival.

Program and focus 
Films shown at the Nashville Film Festival include narrative features, short films, and documentaries. They cross all genres including drama, comedy, family, experimental, and animation. The festival partners with numerous local cultural and ethnic groups.

Because Nashville is known as "Music City," a major focus of the festival is the "Music Films in Music City" section. In addition to films about music, attention to music in films, and the Music Films in Music City awards, NashFilm presents showcases, workshops, and other events bringing songwriters, artists, and music industry insiders together with film professionals to promote collaboration.

Nashville Film Festival, a non-profit 501(c)(3) corporation, also provides year-round outreach efforts with programs for senior citizens, challenged teens, and high school and college-age filmmakers. These programs include lectures and screenings at elementary, middle and high schools, colleges, museums, libraries and community centers. NashFilm also oversees the Young Filmmakers Program designed to teach teens film making skills.

History 
Founder Mary Jane Coleman began the Sinking Creek Film Celebration in East Tennessee in 1969. The festival was later moved to Nashville. In 1998, the name was changed to the Nashville Independent Film Festival and shortened to Nashville Film Festival in 2003. NashFilm's attendance numbers doubled between 2003 and 2007. It is currently held at the Regal Hollywood Stadium 27 & RPX - Nashville in the 100 Oaks area of Nashville, Tennessee.

Accolades 
Nashville Film Festival was voted as one of "50 Film Festivals Worth the Entry Fee" by MovieMaker Magazine again in 2015 and highlighted for "One of the Best Film Festival Prizes" by Film Festival Today.

Recent Nashville Film Festival Award winners

Narrative Competition

Graveyard Shift Competition

Documentary Competition

Shorts

Music videos

Special

2010 Nashville Film Festival Awards 
In 2010 edition, the following prizes have been assigned.

Features

Shorts

Special

References

External links
Short Films Awards Festivals List - Academy of Motion Picture Arts & Sciences

Events in Nashville, Tennessee
Film festivals in Tennessee
Film festivals established in 1969
Culture of Nashville, Tennessee
1969 establishments in Tennessee